Goniobranchus alius is a species of colourful sea slug, a dorid nudibranch, a marine gastropod mollusc in the family Chromodorididae.

Distribution
This species is reported from Kenya to South Africa on the Western seaboard of the Indian Ocean and from Réunion and Sri Lanka. It is also reported from the Marshall Islands.

References

Chromodorididae
Gastropods described in 1987